Takayama tasmanica is a species of dinoflagellates with sigmoid apical grooves first found in Tasmanian and South African waters. It contains fucoxanthin and its derivatives as its main accessory pigments.

Takayama tasmanica is similar to Gymnodinium pulchellum in its external morphology, however it differs from them by having two ventral pores, a large horseshoe-shaped nucleus, and its characteristic central pyrenoid with radiating chloroplasts passing through its nucleus. It possesses gyroxanthin-diester and a gyroxanthin-like accessory pigment, which are missing in its sister species T. helix.

See also
Takayama helix

References

Further reading
De Salas, Miguel F., et al. "Gymnodinoid genera Karenia and Takayama (Dinophyceae) in New Zealand coastal waters." (2005): 135–139.
Mooney, Ben D., et al. "Survey for karlotoxin production in 15 species of gymnodinioid dinoflagellates (Kareniaceae, Dinophyta) 1." Journal of Phycology45.1 (2009): 164–175.

External links

Protists described in 2003
Dinoflagellate species

Dinophyceae